You Could Have It So Much Better is the second studio album by Scottish indie rock band Franz Ferdinand. It was first released on 28 September 2005 in Japan, and later on 3 October in the UK, through the Domino Recording Company. Recorded in both New York City and their own studio in Glasgow with producer Rich Costey, the album spawned four UK top 30 singles: "Do You Want To", "The Fallen", "Walk Away" and "Eleanor Put Your Boots On."

The album became the band's first UK number-one album, and although their debut album was relatively successful in the United States, going platinum and reaching number 32, You Could Have It So Much Better managed to reach number 8 and earn gold status in the United States. The cover design is modeled on Alexander Rodchenko's 1924 portrait of Lilya Brik. It was produced by Rich Costey and Franz Ferdinand.

History
Initially it was reported that the album would simply be eponymous like the debut album, 2004's Franz Ferdinand. Singer Alex Kapranos explained, "The whole point is that the album doesn’t have a title. We decided quite a while ago that we didn’t want to give any of the albums titles, they were just going to be called 'Franz Ferdinand'."

He added, "The albums are going to be identified by their colour schemes rather than a title. The contrast of different colours creates a different mood. We experimented with different combinations of colours and this one stuck. At one level they looked good together, and they capture the mood of this record quite well."

However, on 1 August it was revealed that the band had changed their minds and decided to give the album a name. First, they revealed that the title Outsiders was considered before the current title was decided upon.

As drummer Paul Thomson explained, "I was thinking something similar, but that 'You Could Have It So Much Better' would have been even greater. We talked about how we liked that idea a lot and that it was a real shame that the album wasn't going to have a title. Then we started laughing when we realized that the album hadn't been manufactured yet and we could change it after all." The title was also initially reported as the lengthy You Could Have It So Much Better... With Franz Ferdinand. The album's cover art is inspired by the works of Alexander Rodchenko, the Russian avant-garde photographer and collage pioneer. In particular, the cover image is a direct copy of Rodchenko's of Lilya Brik.

The song "You're the Reason I'm Leaving" is believed to be a dual-meaning track; it can be read as a typical relationship-centered song, but also as being a lighthearted political commentary on the rivalry between former UK Prime Minister Tony Blair and former UK Prime Minister (then-Chancellor of the Exchequer) Gordon Brown. The song contains the lyric: I'd no idea that in four years I'd be hanging from a beam behind the door of number ten, singing "fare thee well, I am leaving, yes I leave it all to you". "Number ten" here refers to 10 Downing Street, the address of the UK Prime Minister. Four years was the typical length of a parliament before five-year fixed term legislation was passed in 2011.

"The Fallen" was used by the NFL on Fox for promos during the 2011 NFL season.

Chart performance
The album was the first chart topping album for both the band and their label, Domino Recording Company, in the UK. In the weeks after being released, the album fell first to number 5, then number 9, number 15, and number 24, before resting at number 40 in the charts. On 25 December 2005, the album had risen to number 37 in the charts. A week later, on 1 January 2006, the album had risen again to number 24 in the UK Albums Chart, but fell two spots to number 26 the following week before rising again to number 23 on 15 January. A week later, the album had fallen again to number 26. On 29 January, the album had fallen a further six spots to number 32. The album fell out of the top 40 altogether the week of 5 February.

Entering and peaking at number 8, the album has sold 378,000 units in the United States , somewhat below the sales success of the band's 2004 debut, although it was certified gold.

Critical reception

You Could Have It So Much Better received universal acclaim from music critics, with a score of 83 out of 100 on Metacritic. Nitsuh Abebe of Pitchfork complimented the band on returning with a "big ridiculous stomper, a song whose hooks get so happily ballroom-glam you'd almost think they stole them from the Sweet or the Bay City Rollers–the kind of song most bands wouldn't be able to pull off without telegraphing a whole lot of irony and embarrassment". Will Hermes of Entertainment Weekly wrote that the album "shows Franz Ferdinand working harder and sounding bigger, befitting their stature as rock's saviors of the moment", while David Fricke of Rolling Stone noted that the album "shows deeper roots in the first wave of white electric dance music: specifically the crunchy-guitar R&B and arch-garage songwriting of 1965–1967 Kinks". Spins Andrew Beaujon stated that it "sounds exactly like what you'd expect, with pumping disco beats and lookin'-sharp guitars on track after propulsive track", and the magazine later ranked it the third best album of 2005 and called it "so much better than its predecessor" thanks to Kapranos' "dubious sensitivity".

Track listing

Personnel
Alex Kapranos – lead guitar, keyboards, lead vocals
Nick McCarthy – rhythm guitar, vocals, keyboards
Bob Hardy – bass guitar
Paul Thomson – drums, percussion, backing vocals

Charts

Weekly charts

Year-end charts

Certifications

Release history

Notes

References

External links
You Could Have It So Much Better e-card

2005 albums
Domino Recording Company albums
Epic Records albums
Franz Ferdinand (band) albums